Roeser is a commune and small town in southern Luxembourg. It is part of the canton of Esch-sur-Alzette. As of the February 1, 2011 census, the commune had a population of 5,302.

, the town of Roeser, which lies in the north of the commune, has a population of 682.  Other towns within the commune include Berchem, Bivange, Crauthem, Kockelscheuer, Livange, and Peppange.

Population

Twin towns — sister cities

Roeser is twinned with:
 Turi, Italy
 Zoufftgen, France

References

External links
 

 
Communes in Esch-sur-Alzette (canton)
Towns in Luxembourg